Antonio Jesús López Nieto (born 25 January 1958 in Málaga, Andalusia) is a former Spanish football referee, who officiated at one FIFA World Cup and during the UEFA Champions League.

In 1995, López accused representatives of Dynamo Kyiv of attempting to bribe him before a UEFA Champions League game against Panathinaikos of Greece, a charge Dynamo Kyiv continue to deny. As a result of this accusation, UEFA banned Dynamo from competitions for two years, a sanction that was later overturned.

He has refereed in three UEFA Cup finals, in 1995 (first leg), 1998 and 2000. López set a record at the 2002 FIFA World Cup, issuing 14 yellow cards and 2 red cards in a match between Germany and Cameroon. This record was then broken in the 2006 tournament by Valentin Ivanov during the match between Portugal and Netherlands, who issued 16 yellow cards and 4 red cards.

References

External links
2002 FIFA World Cup profile (archive)
 
 
 
 

1958 births
Living people
Spanish football referees
UEFA Champions League referees
FIFA World Cup referees
2002 FIFA World Cup referees
UEFA Euro 1996 referees